Jungang Station (Central station) may refer to the following stations in South Korea:

 Jungang Station (Ansan), a station on the Seoul metro line 4
 Jungang Station (Uijeongbu), a station of the U Line in Uijeongbu
 Jungang Station (Busan), a station on the Busan metro line 1
 Dongducheon Jungang Station, a station on the Seoul metro line 1 and the Gyeongwon train line
 Changwon Jungang Station, a train station on the Gyeongjeon Line
 Gwanggyo Jungang Station, a station on the Sinbundang line in Yongin
 Samseong Jungang Station, a station on the Seoul metro line 9

See also
 Central Station (disambiguation)